The 2022 Leeds City Council election took place on Thursday 5 May 2022 to elect members of Leeds City Council in England. It was held on the same day as other local elections across the United Kingdom.

As per the election cycle, one third of the council's 99 seats were contested alongside two casual vacancies in the Horsforth and Roundhay wards.

The Labour Party maintained their majority control of the council, with a net gain of three seats. The Social Democratic Party formed in 1990 secured its only council seat in the United Kingdom.

Election summary

|- style="text-align: right; font-weight: bold;"
! scope="row" colspan="2" | Total
| 167
| 35
| 5
| 5
| 
| 100%
| 100%
| 210,400
| 12,247

The election result had the following consequences for the political composition of the council:

Councillors who did not stand for re-election

Results

Adel & Wharfedale

Alwoodley

Ardsley & Robin Hood

Armley

Beeston & Holbeck

Bramley & Stanningley

Burmantofts & Richmond Hill

Calverley & Farsley

Chapel Allerton

Cross Gates & Whinmoor

Farnley & Wortley

Garforth & Swillington

Gipton & Harehills

Guiseley & Rawdon

Harewood

Headingley & Hyde Park

Horsforth

Hunslet & Riverside

Killingbeck & Seacroft

Kippax & Methley

Kirkstall

Little London & Woodhouse

Middleton Park

Moortown

Morley North

Morley South

Otley & Yeadon

Pudsey

Rothwell

Roundhay

Temple Newsam

Weetwood

Wetherby

Notes

References 

Leeds City Council elections
Leeds